Tor Halvorsen (24 November 1930 – 4 November 1987) was a Norwegian trade unionist and politician for the Labour Party.

Biography 
He was born in Skien. He started his working career in a shoe factory in 1946. In 1952 he was hired as a plumber in Porsgrunn. He then head the trade union of Norsk Hydro at Herøya from 1961 to 1968. He was a district secretary in Arbeidernes Opplysningsforbund from 1968 to 1969, and then a secretary of the Norwegian Confederation of Trade Unions, a position he held from 1969 to 1973 and 1976 to 1977.

He served as a deputy representative to the Parliament of Norway from Telemark during the term 1969–1973. He was a member of Skien city council from 1963 to 1971, and chaired the local Labour Party chapter from 1969 to 1971. In 1973 he was named Minister of the Environment in Bratteli's Second Cabinet. During a cabinet reshuffle in 1974 he became Minister of Social Affairs, first acting from April, then permanently from September. He replaced the deceased Sonja Ludvigsen, and in August 1974 the newspaper Verdens Gang wrote, wrongly, that the "only thing which can be said to be certain now, is that the new Minister of Social Affairs will be a woman". Halvorsen sat throughout the time of Bratteli's Second Cabinet, to 1976. In 1977 he became leader of the Confederation of Trade Unions, a position he kept until his death in 1987. At the same time he was a member of the Labour Party central board from 1977 to 1987.

Halvorsen was chairman of Norsk Arbeiderpresse for some time, and deputy chairman of Rikshospitalet from 1981 to 1987. He was a board member of Norsk Medisinaldepot from 1977 to 1987 and 1980 to 1987, of Folketrygdfondet from 1978 to 1987, the Norwegian Industrial Bank from 1980 to 1981 and Norsk Folkeferie, Strømmens Verksted and Samvirke forsikring. He was a deputy board member of the Norwegian Directorate of Labour from 1971 to 1973 and a deputy member of NTNF from 1972 to 1976.

References

1930 births
1987 deaths
Politicians from Skien
Norwegian trade unionists
Politicians from Telemark
Deputy members of the Storting
Government ministers of Norway
Ministers of Climate and the Environment of Norway
Labour Party (Norway) politicians